In the fictional world of the television series Buffy the Vampire Slayer and its spin-off series Angel, a vampire is a unique variety of demon that can only exist on the earthly plane by inhabiting and animating a human corpse. In Fray, a Buffy comic book spin-off set about a century in the future, vampires are also called lurks.

Description

The vampires in the canonical Buffyverse differ greatly from those that appeared in the 1992 Buffy the Vampire Slayer movie. The movie's vampires are able to fly, look pale but relatively human, and do not crumble to dust when killed. The canonical vampires (introduced in the first episode of the television series) are demonic spirits that inhabit human corpses.Since their partly human nature, vampires are considered impure by other demons who sometimes call them "blood rats".

According to Rupert Giles, when the ancient race of demons were called the Old Ones were banished from Earth. The last one fed on a human and mixed their blood, creating the first vampire. This vampire then feeds on other humans and makes more of its kind, essentially being a biological weapon against the human race for the Old Ones. According to Illyria, vampires existed during her time as an Old Onelong before the rest were banished from the realm. Vampires possess all the memories and skills of their human predecessors. They also retain much of their host's personality, including any mental illnesses or emotional instabilities. For example, Spike (unlike most vampires) retained his love for his dying mother. Harmony kept her vain, shallow valley girl personality and her love of unicorns. Darla tells the newly turned Liam/Angelus that "what we were, informs what we become"; after her resurrection as a human, she says that the darkness he unleashed as Angelus was always in him as a human, long before they met, resulted from the memories of the abuses by his father.

Vampires possess superhuman abilities, such as increased strength, heightened senses, and accelerated healingall of which increase as they grow older or when they drink the blood of powerful supernatural creatures. They can drain animalsincluding humansof their blood in a few seconds. Vampires are immortal and can live indefinitely without any signs of aging, though extremely old vampires acquire demonic features such as cloven hooves for hands, and lose their resemblance to humans. Vampiresexcept those who are skilled with powerful magic such as Count Draculacannot shape-shift.

Vampires in the Buffyverse live on a diet of blood, preferring fresh human blood; they can distinguish the blood of different animals by flavor, and those who do not drink human blood enjoy that of otters. They require no other food or drink, and although they can ingest it they generally find it bland. Prolonged deprivation of blood can impair a vampire's higher brain functions and they become "living skeletons", but lack of blood will not result in a vampire's death. They do not need to breathe airalthough they can breathe to speak or smokeand they cannot pass breath on to others via CPR. They are affected by drugs, poisons, and electricity, and they can be sedated and tasered. Some vampires enjoy both alcoholic and caffeinated beverages, and tobacco.

Vampires can change at will between human appearance and a monstrous form with a pronounced brow ridge, yellow eyes, and sharp teeth. They make a roaring sound when angered. In human form, they can be detected by their lack of heartbeat and lower body temperature. They do not cast reflections, although they can be photographed and filmed. They are largely immune to mind-reading, but Willow Rosenberg can telepathically communicate with vampires such as Spike.

Vampires can be killed by beheading, burning with fire, sunlight, or excessive amount of holy water, by penetration of the heart by a wooden object, or powerful explosives. When killed, a vampire rapidly turns to dry dust. They heal quickly from most injuries but do not regrow lost limbs (although Spike was able to use his hands when they were reattached after being amputated by a mentally disturbed Slayer) and can acquire scars. Their flesh burns in direct sunlight, and on contact with blessed objects such as holy water, a Bible, recently consecrated ground or a Christian cross. They can enter consecrated buildings but appear to feel ill at ease. Vampires are attracted to bright colors and are said to dislike garlic.

Vampires cannot enter a human residence without having been invited once by a living resident; however, once given, such an invitation can only be revoked by a magic ritual. If all living residents die, vampires can enter freely. Areas open to the public and the homes of other vampires, demons, and non-humans are not protected.

To reproduce, vampires must drain a human being of most of his or her blood, then force the victim to drink some of the vampire's blood. This process is known as "siring", and the vampire who does so is called a "sire". Sires often act as mentors to their 'children' and form small covens of related vampires for various purposes. Some vampires can be telepathically linked to those that they have sired. The amount of time it takes for a new vampire to rise seems to vary; Buffy often kills vampires as they rise from their graves, but other vampires rise after only a few hours. There is no explanation given for this in the series. They cannot normally reproduce sexually, but under mystical means allow Angel and Darla to conceive a son, Connor, who has a human soul with vampire-like abilities, but none of their weaknesses or need to drink blood.

Vampires in the Buffyverse do not have human souls, but Giles in "The Harvest" says the human corpse a vampire is born into is infected with a demon soul via vampiric blood, and therefore lacks a conscience. Angel and Spikevampires who have had their human souls restored to themfeel remorse for their previous actions. However, soulless vampires are capable of feeling human emotions such as love, though these tend to be expressed as twisted and obsessive behavior.

Variations of vampires are seen on both Buffy and Angel. In the Angel season two episode "Through the Looking Glass", Angel and his team travel to a parallel world, Pylea, where he becomes a "Van-Tal" demon with green skin, spines and a bestial appearance. This form is described by Wesley as the vampire (specifically the demon that creates the vampire) in its purest form. While in this form, Angel lacks the ability to reason, possessing neither the compassion his soul gives him nor the sadism he possesses as Angelus.

The seventh season of Buffy introduces the Turok-Han, an ancient species of vampire analogous to Neanderthal man.  These Turok-Han, colloquially referred to as "über-vamps", are stronger and harder to kill than common vampires, can usually withstand a stake to the chest without dusting and show only minor burns when doused with holy water, but can still be killed by beheading or sunlight. The Turok-Han show very little intelligence and cannot speak.

At the end of Season Eight, Buffy destroys the Seed of Wonder, affecting the magical world but not active demons and vampires on Earth. All new vampires sired after the Seed's destruction rise as mindless, feral creatures that Xander Harris dubs "zompires". However, at the end of Season Nine, after rogue slayer Simone Doffler's experiment to create an ultimate vampire upon the slayers who followed her, one slayer, Vicki, has risen as a vampire after Doffler's death who exhibits the abilities of immunity to sunlight and shape shifting. During the beginning of Season Ten, Vicki and the new breed of vampires she sired are shown to be as strong and able withstand a stake to the chest as Turok-Han, however exhibiting a new vulnerability to silver as werewolves.

Creation

The idea of the "vamp faces" — to have vampires' human features distort to become more demonic — was implemented because Whedon wanted to have high school students that the other characters could interact with normally only to discover that these people would turn out be vampires, creating a sense of paranoia. He also wanted to make the vampires look demonic, stating, "I didn't think I really wanted to put a show on the air about a high school girl who was stabbing normal-looking people in the heart. I thought somehow that might send the wrong message, but when they are clearly monsters, it takes it to a level of fantasy that is safer."

In early episodes, the vampires appeared "very white-faced, very creepy, very ghoulish". This was changed in later seasons to make the vampires look more human because of the sympathetic vampire character Angel and because elaborate make-up was time-consuming. Whedon said that people thought the white faces were "funny looking" but found it creepy, comparing it to the monsters in zombie movies such as Day of the Dead and The Evil Dead. The character of the Master was designed to be in permanent vamp face to highlight his age and make him appear animalistic. Make-up artist John Vulich based the Master's appearance on a bat, saying that the character has devolved to a more primal, demonic state over the years.

It was decided that vampires and their clothes would turn to dust after they died. The introduction to one episode, "The Wish", parodied this vampiric trait; when Buffy kills a non-humanoid demon, Willow wonders why the demon corpse "doesn't go poof" and must be buried. Joss Whedon had the vampires explode into dust because it was practical, it demonstrates that they are monsters, he did not want a high school girl killing bad guys every episode and have them clean up bodies for 20 minutes, and it also "looks really cool".

In the first episode, vampires' clothes reflect the era in which they died. Joss Whedon felt this concept was a "charming notion" but rejected it because he believed that if every vampire in the show were dressed in old-fashioned clothes, they would cease to be scary.

When creating the vampire "rules" that they would use in the show, the writers used elements from existing vampire lore. They decided the vampires would not fly as in the Buffy movie because they could not make flying vampires look convincing on a television budget. Garlic is mentioned or used as vampire repellent in a few episodes, but its effect on vampires is never stated. Some established rules, such as a vampire's inability to enter a home uninvited, both helped and hindered the storytelling. Whedon said that whereas shows such as The X-Files spend time explaining the science behind the supernatural and making it as real as possible, Buffy and Angel are more concerned with the emotion resulting from these creatures and events than justifying how they could conceivably exist. The shows therefore tend to gloss over the details of vampire and demon lore, simply using the Hellmouth as a plot device to explain unexplainable things.

See also
 Vampire fiction

References

External links
 Vampires section at "All Things Philosophical on BtVS and AtS"

Fictional characters with accelerated healing
Fictional characters with superhuman strength
Fictional characters who can move at superhuman speeds
Fictional hybrid life forms
Buffy the Vampire Slayer
Fictional warrior races